Elkiam Khumalo (1940 – 27 August 1996) was a South African football midfielder who played for Moroka Swallows and Kaizer Chiefs. He was shot during a hijacking in 1996. He is the father of Doctor Khumalo.

Club career
Khumalo played for Moroka Swallows in the First Division where he helped win their only SA Soccer Championship in 1965 and later Kaizer Chiefs in NPSL being one of its first recruits in 1971 and also finishing as a runner up in that season.

Nickname
He was nicknamed "Pro" or "Professor" for his ability to read, dictate play, his skill and intelligence.

International career
Khumalo also represented Transvaal at the 1963 and 1973 Africa Games.

Coaching career
Khumalo coached Chiefs six times and led them to 3 NPSL titles, 3 BP Top 8 titles, 2 Nedbank Cup titles and 2 Sales House Cup titles. He also coached Kaizer Chiefs development sides where his son, Doctor Khumalo excelled and rose to be one of South Africa's best midfielders. He also discovered 19-year-old Thabang Lebese in 1992.

Death
A few months after his son won the Africa Cup of Nations, Khumalo died on 27 August 1996 in hospital when he was shot during a hijacking outside his home in Soweto. He was shot in the back and his Volkswagen was stolen. Nelson Mandela sent a letter of condolence to Khumalo's wife reading, "':I learnt with shock of the fatal attack on your husband yesterday.
Eliakim was an example and role model to all the young people of this country more especially those associated with football. His death is a tragic loss to us all.
The police will leave no stone unturned to ensure that the perpetrators of this deed are brought to book.
To you and your family, I convey my sincere condolences in this hour of grief and sorrow''. In 1997 his hijackers, Lawrence Mazimba and Samson Masithulele were caught.

See also
Kaizer Chiefs F.C

References

1940 births
1996 deaths
Association football midfielders
South African soccer players
South African soccer managers
Sportspeople from Soweto
Kaizer Chiefs F.C. players
People murdered in South Africa
South African murder victims
Deaths by firearm in South Africa